Raja Temenggung of Muar (also known by the title of Temenggong Paduka Tuan of Muar ) was a noble title used to refer to the family of Dato' Pasir Raja and his descendants, which ruled the Muar fief, which was a part of the Johor Empire from the middle of the seventeenth century onwards.

History

During the mid-seventeenth century, the Sultan of Johor took the hand of Marhum Bakal, the sister of Bendahara Tun Habib Abdul Majid and Sayyid Ja'afar, the Dato' Pasir Raja. As a dowry, Dato' Pasir Raja was granted the fief of Muar. The first Raja Temenggung of Muar is Sa Akar di-Raja whose mausoleum is found Kampung Lubuk Batu, Segamat next to the mausoleum of Bendahara Tepok founder of Segamat; his descendants were similarly buried at Kampung Lubuk Batu. The 7th Raja Temenggung, Engku Abdul Salleh, was buried in Pengkalan Kota, their administrative centre.

In the early nineteenth century, the fief was divided into eight hamlets, each ruled by a chieftain with the Raja Temenggung of Muar as the head of the "federation".  Muar was caught in a power grab by the Maharaja of Johor, Abu Bakar after its puppet ruler, Sultan Ali died. The British "offered" its good services to restore calm. Without the British pressure, recognition of Tengku Alam was a foregone conclusion. As the British sided with the Maharaja, the Raja Temenggung and the chieftains were captured and coerced into accepting the Maharaja's lordship.  An election which at the suggestion of the British, was held in which the chieftains voted in favour of joining Johor, but Sultan Ali's son, Tengku Alam and the Muar Temenggung were indignant and made vociferous claims upon Muar (even though the Muar Temenggung later relented under heavy pressure). Continued claims by Tengku Alam and his supporters resulted in the outbreak of the Jementah Civil War the following year, in which the British forces (allied with the Maharaja) subdued Tengku Alam's supporters. The Muar Temenggung was subsequently paid an annual stipend by the Maharaja (Sultan after 1885) as part of a settlement treaty made on 5 February 1879 with the annexation of the Muar fiefdom. The office of the Temenggung of Muar was later abolished in 1902.

List of title holders

Sa Akar Di-Raja, Raja Temenggung Muar I
Sa Amar Di-Raja, Raja Temenggung Muar II
Engku Burok, Raja Temenggung Muar III
Engku Konik, Raja Temenggung Muar IV
Engku Said, Raja Temenggung Muar V
Engku Ismail, Raja Temenggung Muar VI
Engku Muhammad Salleh, Raja Temenggung Muar VII
Wan Abdul Rahman, Raja Temenggung Muar VIII (the last Raja Temenggung)

See also
Ali al-Uraidhi ibn Ja'far al-Sadiq

Notes

References

 R. O. Winstedt, A History of Johore (1365–1941), (M.B.R.A.S. Reprints, 6.) Kuala Lumpur: Malaysian Branch of the Royal Asiatic Society, 1992, 
 R. O. Windstedt, Temenggungs of Muar, Journal of Malayan Branch of Royal Asiatic Society, Vol X Part 1, 1932
 Tun Suzana Tun Othman, Ahlul Bait Rasulullah SAW dan Kesultanan Melayu, Crescent News Sdn Bhd, 2008,

External links
 Official website of the Household of the Raja Temenggung of Muar, PEWARIS (Persatuan Waris Temenggong Muar), retrieved March 1, 2009

Muar District
History of Muar
History of Johor
Noble titles of Malaysia